The 1960 Edmonton, Alberta municipal election was held October 19, 1960, to elect five aldermen to sit on Edmonton City Council and three trustees to sit on each of the public and separate school boards.  The electorate also decided eight plebiscite questions.

There were ten aldermen on city council, but five of the positions were already filled: William Henning, Angus McGugan, Ed Leger, Gordon McClary, and McKim Ross were all elected to two-year terms in 1959 and were still in office.

There were seven trustees on the public school board, but four of the positions were already filled: Angus MacDonald, Edith Rogers, Vernon Johnson, and Douglas Thomson were elected to two-year terms in 1959 and were still in office.  The same was true on the separate board, where Joseph Moreau, Orest Demco, Catherine McGrath, and Henry Carrigan were continuing.

Voter turnout

There were 26,009 ballots cast out of 158,771 eligible voters, for a voter turnout of 16.4%.

Results

(bold indicates elected, italics indicate incumbent)

Aldermen
Each voter could cast up to five votes.
Voting was at-large so each voter could vote for any candidate in the running. The most popular candidates of two different parties were elected; the least popular were not.

The elected council represented a variety of interests. Candidates belonging two different parties - Civic Government Association and Civic Reform Association - were elected. But smaller voting blocks were denied representation. Ivor Dent of the CCF (soon to be the NDP) was denied a seat although getting a vote from more than a third of the voters.

Three of the five successful candidates got a vote from a majority of voters across the city.

Public school trustees

Separate (Catholic) school trustees

Plebiscites

At-Large Elections

Are you in favour of changing the Election System for Alderman and Public School Board Members so that all such elected representatives are elected from the City at large without regard to whether they live North or South of the North Saskatchewan River or own fifty percent of their property North or South of this river?
Yes - 17204
No - 9668

Paving

Shall Council pass a bylaw creating a debenture debt in the sum of $450,000.00 for the City share of standard paving of arterial and residential streets?
Yes - 14728
No - 4489

Asphalt on Existing Gravel Streets

Shall Council pass a bylaw creating a debenture debt in the sum of $250,000.00 for the City share of asphalt paving on existing gravel arterial and residential streets?
Yes - 14501
No - 4471

Asphalt on New Gravel Streets

Shall Council pass a bylaw creating a debenture debt in the sum of $500,000.00 for the City share of asphalt paving on new gravel arterial and residential streets?
Yes - 13241
No - 5338

Traffic Lights

Shall Council pass a bylaw creating a debenture debt in the sum of $180,000.00 in order to purchase and locate traffic lights on certain highway intersections within the City?
Yes - 15812
No - 3554

Parks

Shall Council pass a bylaw creating a debenture debt in the sum of $600,000.00 for the purpose of constructing and improving parks and playgrounds?
Yes - 14455
No - 4829

Bridge

Shall Council pass a bylaw creating a debenture debt in the sum of $500,000.00 for the purpose of constructing a district bridge as part of the City's overall arterial road system?
Yes - 15043
No - 4454

Library

Shall Council pass a bylaw creating a debenture debt in the sum of $165,000.00 for the purpose of constructing a district library?
Yes - 12173
No - 6756

References

External links
City of Edmonton: Edmonton Elections

1960
1960 elections in Canada
1960 in Alberta